Foxcroft School, founded in 1914 by Charlotte Haxall Noland, is a college-preparatory boarding and day school for girls in grades 9-12, located near Middleburg, Virginia, United States. In its century of existence, Foxcroft has educated the daughters of corporate titans and congressmen, including women from the Rockefeller, Carnegie, Mellon, Auchincloss and Astor families. It is accredited by the Virginia Association of Independent Schools and the National Association of Independent Schools, and is a founding member of the National Coalition of Girls' Schools.

Campus

Academic facilities
Schoolhouse is the main academic building on campus which houses a majority of the classes. The two wings on either side of the building house the visual arts department and the theatre. The science wing has labs for biology, chemistry, physics, and animal science classes, and an engineering workshop. Additionally, there is a photographic studio, complete with a dark room. A recent addition is the state-of-the-art Innovation Lab, which is home to laser cutters and 3-D printers.

Library
The Audrey Bruce Currier Library, named after a Foxcroft School alum, sits in the center of the campus and is home to additional classrooms, meeting spaces, and a computer lab. The library is also the gathering space for the bi-weekly assemblies known as "Morning Meeting."

Athletics facilities
A new Activities Center was built in 2013, housing a multi-purpose double-box gym (Leipheimer Gym0. While commonly used for basketball and volleyball, it is frequently converted to indoor practice spaces for field hockey, tennis, and lacrosse. Encircling the top of the double-box is a two-lane track, around which various exercise machines sit. The competition gymnasium, or the Engelhard, is housed in the same Activities Center. In addition to the gyms, the student lounge (Roomies), complete with a full kitchen, is in the same building. A weight-room with treadmills and ellipticals, plus an athletic nurse and physical therapy office complete the Activities Center. 
The outdoor athletic facilities include a recreational-sized pool, eight tennis courts, two softball diamonds (one turf, one dirt), two full-sized turf fields, and an outdoor two-lane track.

The Stables
Foxcroft School has stables on campus. The Jean du Pont McConnell Stables house around sixty horses, both school-owned and privately owned. An indoor ring (dimensions: 100x200) is connected to the stables as well. Outdoors, the grassy expanse of Big Track is well-suited for cross-country riding and practice. Students can also use miles of trails to ride or run on. The horses are housed in the stables during the day and turned out onto the large field spaces situated right on campus.

Dormitories
The campus has five student dorms, including one freshman dorm. The remaining dorms have a mix of sophomores, juniors, and senior dorm leaders (prefects). Every year, all the dorms compete in Battle of the Dorms, where groups put on skits and the like.

Ruth T. Bedford Scholarships
In the fall of 2014, Standard Oil heiress Ruth T. Bedford, a member of the class of 1932, unexpectedly donated $40 million to the school in her will.

A year later, the school announced the establishment of the Ruth T. Bedford ’32 Merit Scholarship for the Arts, which is open only to external applicants wishing to join the school. Up to eight students receive $25,000 a year each, and beneficiaries need to share Ruth T. Bedford’s sense of adventure and enterprise as well as her passion for the arts.

Fox/Hound Tradition 
During World War I, students at Foxcroft were not allowed to return home. To cope, the founder of the school, Miss Charlotte, started a now long-standing tradition called "Fox/Hound," as a way for the girls to spend their time. The entirety of the school, including the teachers, are split up into two teams, the Foxes and the Hounds. The teams rival each other in three sports competitions; Field Hockey (fall), Basketball (winter), and Horseback Riding (spring). Each year, the Battle for the Cup is renewed, and the teams compete for the cup which is earned from a victory in the Big Team Basketball game.

Team tryouts and practices begin in the two weeks leading up to the competitions. Team captains are chosen and they spend time making gifts for their team members. The week leading up to each competition is filled with pep-rallies, known as "Sing Sings" as a way to encourage each team for a victory. On the Thursday before the competitions, the officers and mascots from each team decorate Schoolhouse, the academic building. One side of Schoolhouse is designated for the Foxes, and the other for the Hounds.

The spirit central to the Fox/Hound tradition is "friends 'till the end."

Notable alumnae

Anne Armstrong, diplomat and politician
Jane Forbes Clark, president and trustee of the United States Equestrian Team Foundation; chairman of the National Baseball Hall of Fame
Frances FitzGerald, Pulitzer Prize-winning writer
Nina Fout, Olympic equestrian
Olivia Stokes Hatch, socialite and American Red Cross volunteer
Dorothy Douglas Robinson Kidder, socialite, philanthropist, political hostess
Gertrude Sanford Legendre, socialite & World War II spy
Ruth du Pont Lord, psychotherapist, writer, and arts patron
Pamela Mars, chairwoman, Mars, Incorporated
Victoria B. Mars, chairwoman of Mars, Incorporated; secretary of the board of trustees of Foxcroft School. 
Cordelia Scaife May, philanthropist
Mary McFadden, art collector, editor, fashion designer, and writer.
Rachel Lambert Mellon ("Bunny"), heiress, horticulturalist, creator of the White House Rose Garden
Elizabeth Meyer, equestrian
Sister Parish, interior decorator and socialite
Ursula Plassnik, Austrian diplomat and politician (exchange student 1971-1972)
Patsy Pulitzer (1928–2011), model, socialite and philanthropist 
Keshia Knight Pulliam, actress, The Cosby Show
Mary Todhunter Clark Rockefeller, first wife of Nelson Rockefeller
Kay Sage, Surrealist artist and poet
Christine Todd Whitman, former head of the EPA, former Governor of New Jersey
Mollie Wilmot, philanthropist and socialite
Flora Payne Whitney, artist, art collector, socialite, member of the Whitney family and Vanderbilt family
Stephanie Zimbalist, actress, Remington Steele

References

External links 
 Foxcroft's Web site
 The Association of Boarding Schools profile
 Boarding School Review

Boarding schools in Virginia
Private high schools in Virginia
Independent School League
Schools in Loudoun County, Virginia
Educational institutions established in 1914
Girls' schools in Virginia
1914 establishments in Virginia